The 1836 United States presidential election in Arkansas took place between November 3 and December 7, 1836, as part of the 1836 United States presidential election. Voters chose three representatives, or electors to the Electoral College, who voted for President and Vice President.

Arkansas, having been admitted to the Union as the 25th state on June 15, 1836, voted for the Democratic candidate, Martin Van Buren, over Whig candidate Hugh White during its first presidential election. Van Buren won Arkansas by a margin of 28.16%.

Results

See also
 United States presidential elections in Arkansas

References

Arkansas
1836
1836 Arkansas elections